Chun Woo-hee (born April 20, 1987) is a South Korean actress. She made her acting debut in 2004, but first drew attention with her supporting role as a rebellious teenager in the 2011 box-office hit Sunny. In 2014, Chun received critical acclaim for her leading role as the title character in Han Gong-ju, a coming-of-age indie about a traumatized young woman trying to move on with her life after a tragedy. Her other notable films include The Piper (2015), The Beauty Inside (2015), Love, Lies (2016) and The Wailing (2016).

Philanthropy 
On February 11, 2023, Chun donated  to help 2023 Turkey–Syria earthquake, by donating money through Hope Bridge National Disaster Relief Association.

Filmography

Film

Television series

Web series

Television shows

Awards and nominations

Notes

References

External links

 
 
 

1987 births
Living people
South Korean film actresses
South Korean television actresses
Kyonggi University alumni
People from Icheon
21st-century South Korean actresses
Yeongyang Cheon clan
Best New Actress Paeksang Arts Award (film) winners